KRVV (100.1 FM, "100.1 The Beat") is an American radio station licensed 
to Bastrop, Louisiana, and serving the Monroe, Louisiana region.  The station is owned by The Radio People and the broadcast license is held by Holladay Broadcasting Of Louisiana, LLC.  Studios are located in Monroe, and its transmitter is located south of Bastrop.

Programming
KRVV broadcasts an urban/hip-hop music format to the Monroe, Louisiana, area.  KRVV air personalities include The Steve Harvey Morning Show, Grave Digga, DJ Make-A-Move, and The Breakfast Club.

History
At one time KRVV used to be a Public Broadcasting Radio Station back in 1967 until 1991 when new owners Holladay Broadcasting changed the station's branding and format to "The River", a mostly classic rock format that evolved into current mainstream rock, until again changing to "100.1 The Beat" broadcasting an urban contemporary format. The station has been airing its current format since 1993.

Format

 Urban 1993–Present

External links
KRVV official website

Radio stations in Louisiana
Urban contemporary radio stations in the United States
The Radio People radio stations
Radio stations established in 1967